Soad Fezzani is a Libyan swimmer. She competed in three events at the 1980 Summer Olympics.

References

Year of birth missing (living people)
Living people
Libyan female swimmers
Olympic swimmers of Libya
Swimmers at the 1980 Summer Olympics
Place of birth missing (living people)